Mirza Halvadžić (born 15 February 1996) is a Swedish professional footballer of Bosnian descent who plays as an attacking midfielder for Lunds BK.

International career
Halvadžić has represented the bronze-winning Sweden U17 national team in the 2013 FIFA U-17 World Cup. In total, he played 31 matches for the U17 team and scored four goals. He has played eight matches and scored three goals for the Sweden U19 national team.

Honours

IFK Norrköping
Allsvenskan: 2015

Mjällby AIF
Superettan: 2019

Sweden U17
FIFA U-17 World Cup Third place: 2013

References

External links

1996 births
Living people
Sportspeople from Lund
Swedish footballers
Swedish people of Bosnia and Herzegovina descent
Sweden youth international footballers
Association football midfielders
Malmö FF players
IFK Norrköping players
FK Željezničar Sarajevo players
Mjällby AIF players
Lunds BK players
FK Sloboda Tuzla players
Torns IF players
Allsvenskan players
Premier League of Bosnia and Herzegovina players
Superettan players
Ettan Fotboll players